Neochlamisus is a genus of leaf beetles in the tribe Fulcidacini (the warty leaf beetles). They are members of the case-bearing leaf beetle group, the Camptosomata. Measuring 3–4 millimeters in length as adults, they are cryptic, superficially resembling caterpillar frass. Seventeen, sometimes 18 species are presently accepted in this genus, all of them occurring in North America (including Mexico; some were previously in the genus Chlamisus).

Life history
In the spring, female Neochlamisus lay eggs singly on the leaves or stems of their host plant and then form a case of fecal material around each.  The larvae remain on the natal host plant and add to and enlarge their fecal cases as they grow. Case enlargement in Neochlamisus is an elaborate process that larvae perform regularly until the case is sealed to the substrate prior to pupation. During this stage of the life cycle, beetles are immobile and are particularly vulnerable to predation. After about twenty days the newly hardened adult cuts a clean circle around the apex of the case, lifts this cap, and flies off to feed and mate. Neochlamisus adults feed and mate on the larval host plant species.

Neochlamisus species are typically very host-plant-specific and most species primarily use but a
single host plant genus or even a single species. A rather well-known exception is N. bebbianae which feeds on particular species from six tree genera representing five different plant families. N. bebbianae populations associated with each of these plants are referred to as separate "host forms" and are the subject of ongoing studies of host-associated speciation.

Species
Seventeen species are widely recognised:

Neochlamisus alni (Brown, 1943)
Neochlamisus assimilis (Klug, 1824)
Neochlamisus bebbianae (Brown, 1943)
Neochlamisus bimaculatus Karren, 1972
Neochlamisus chamaedaphnes (Brown, 1943)
Neochlamisus comptoniae (Brown, 1943)
Neochlamisus cribripennis (J. L. LeConte, 1878)
Neochlamisus eubati (Brown, 1952)
Neochlamisus fragariae (Brown, 1952)
Neochlamisus gibbosus (Fabricius, 1777)
Neochlamisus insularis (Schaeffer, 1926)
Neochlamisus moestificus (Lacordaire, 1848)
Neochlamisus platani (Brown, 1952)
Neochlamisus scabripennis (Schaeffer, 1926)
Neochlamisus subelatus (Schaeffer, 1926)
Neochlamisus tuberculatus (Klug, 1824)
Neochlamisus velutinus Karren, 1972

Footnotes

References
  (2005): Aspects of the natural history of Neochlamisus (Coleoptera: Chrysomelidae): fecal-case-associated life history and behavior, with a method for studying insect constructions. Annals of the Entomological Society of America 98(5): 711–725.  HTML abstract
  (1943): The Canadian species of Exema and Arthrochlamys (Coleoptera, Chrysomelidae). Canadian Entomologist 75: 119–131.
  (1946): Some new Chrysomelidae, with notes on other species (Coleoptera). Canadian Entomologist 84: 48–49.
  (1952): Some species of Phytophaga (Coleoptera). Canadian Entomologist 84: 336–342.
  (2008): Faecal case architecture in the gibbosus species group of Neochlamisus Karren, 1972 (Coleoptera: Chrysomelidae: Cryptocephalinae: Chlamisini). Zoological Journal of the Linnean Society 152(2): 315–351.  (HTML abstract)
  (1998): Isolating a role for natural selection in speciation: host adaptation and sexual isolation in Neochlamisus bebbianae leaf beetles. Evolution 52(6): 1744–1759.  (HTML abstract and first page image)
  (2002): Herbivorous insects: model systems for the comparative study of speciation ecology. Genetica 116(2-3): 251–267.  (HTML abstract)
  (1972): A revision of the subfamily Chlamisinae of America north of Mexico (Coleoptera: Chrysomelidae). University of Kansas Science Bulletin 49(12): 875–988.

Cryptocephalinae
Chrysomelidae genera